Georgi Nikolov Dermendziev (born 4 January 1955) is a Bulgarian professional football manager and former player who played as a defender.

Coaching career
After managing Spartak Plovdiv as a head coach for one season, he became an assistant at Litex Lovech under Ferario Spasov. He remained in this role for several years, followed by short spells at Botev Plovdiv and Sliven. He later briefly managed the latter during the 2010-11 A Group, but was unable to help them avoid relegation.

Ludogorets Razgrad
On July 31, 2014, Dermendzhiev replaced Stoycho Stoev as head coach at Ludogorets following the latter's disappointing 0-0 home draw against Partizan Belgrade in a Champions League qualifying match.

On 27 August 2014, Dermendzhiev became the second Bulgarian manager (after Stanimir Stoilov in 2006) to qualify a team from his country to the group stage of the Champions League. On 22 October 2014 he became the first Bulgarian coach to achieve a win in the Champions League's group phase when Ludogorets beat Basel.

He resigned from the team on 31 May 2015, but after Ludogorets was unsuccessfully led by his successors Bruno Ribeiro and Eduard Eranosyan, he was appointed again as manager on 6 November.

In the 2016–17 Champions League Ludogorets won the qualifiers against Mladost Podgorica and Red Star Belgrade, and the play-off against Viktoria Plzeň, respectively, thus becoming the first Bulgarian team to qualify twice for the group stage of the tournament, both times with Georgi Dermendzhiev as a coach.

Dermendzhiev resigned on 9 August 2017 after the team failed to win the 2017 Bulgarian Supercup.

Ordabasy
On 9 January 2018 Dermendzhiev signed a deal with the Kazakhstan Premier League team Ordabasy. He left the position in June 2018.

Levski Sofia
On 22 January 2019, Dermendzhiev returned to Bulgaria, being appointed as head coach of Levski Sofia. He was released from his duties on 29 April 2019.

Bulgaria
In October 2019, Dermendzhiev was appointed as head coach of the national team to manage the side during the remaining Euro 2020 qualifiers. In April 2020, his contract was extended for an additional six months, with the option for a further one year and a half. In December 2020, the Football Union announced that Dermendzhiev will not continue in his position as manager after the national team failed to qualify for Euro 2020 via the playoff route and was relegated from League B to League C in the Nations League. Dermendzhiev had previously faced strong criticism by Minister of Youth and Sports Krasen Kralev due to the perceived failure to integrate more U-21 players into the senior team and the results attained, including the team's tendency to concede last-minute goals.

Managerial statistics

Career honours

Player
Slavia Sofia
Bulgarian Cup:
Winners (1): 1979–80

Head coach
Ludogorets Razgrad

Bulgarian A Group:
Champions (3): 2014–15, 2015–16, 2016–17

Bulgarian Supercup:
Winners (1): 2014

Bulgarian Manager of the Year: 
Winner (1): 2014

References

External links
Official website

1955 births
Living people
Bulgarian footballers
PFC Slavia Sofia players
FC Yantra Gabrovo players
FC Spartak Plovdiv players
First Professional Football League (Bulgaria) players
Association football defenders
Bulgarian football managers
Bulgarian expatriate football managers
PFC Ludogorets Razgrad managers
FC Ordabasy managers
PFC Levski Sofia managers
Expatriate football managers in Kazakhstan
Bulgarian expatriate sportspeople in Kazakhstan
Footballers from Plovdiv
Bulgaria national football team managers